Tage Leif Lundin (11 November 1933 – 6 August 2019) was a Swedish biathlon competitor who won a team bronze medal at the 1961 World Championships. He competed at the 1960 Winter Olympics and finished 12th.

References

1933 births
2019 deaths
Biathletes at the 1960 Winter Olympics
Swedish male biathletes
Olympic biathletes of Sweden
Biathlon World Championships medalists
20th-century Swedish people